William Moorhouse  may refer to:

 William Barnard Rhodes-Moorhouse, nephew of the above, first airman to be awarded the Victoria Cross
 William Moorhouse, 19th century founder of Moorhouse's Brewery
 William Sefton Moorhouse, 19th century New Zealand politician